Göran Silfverhielm (1681 – January 7, 1737) was a Swedish Field Marshal.

Silfverhielm was born in Småland.  He was conferred the dignity of Baron in 1725, and was promoted to Field Marshal in 1734. Silfverhielm was married to Hedvig Ulrika Ekeblad, daughter of the wealthy and influential governor Claes Ekeblad Elder. He is buried in Nasby Church, Vetlanda municipality.

He was one of the officers who followed Charles XII of Sweden at Bender after the disaster at Poltava and Perevolochna.

Field marshals of Sweden
Swedish generals
1737 deaths
1681 births